Songs from the Trees (A Musical Memoir Collection) is a two-disc compilation set by American singer-songwriter Carly Simon, released on November 20, 2015.

The collection was released as a tie-in to Simon's memoir Boys in the Trees. It contains newly remastered versions of songs spanning 23 years of her career, ranging from 1964's "Winkin', Blinkin', and Nod" (as The Simon Sisters), through 1987's "Two Hot Girls (On a Hot Summer Night)" from the album Coming Around Again. Also included are two previously unreleased songs: "Showdown" (originally recorded during the sessions for her 1978 album Boys in the Trees) and "I Can't Thank You Enough", a brand new song written and performed with her son Ben Taylor.

Reception

AllMusic rated the album 4 stars out of 5, writing "Pointedly not a greatest-hits collection, the double-disc compilation instead is a soundtrack to Carly Simon's 2015 memoir Boys in the Trees. Surely, there are hits here -- not all of them, but "You're So Vain", "Mockingbird", "You Belong to Me", and "Anticipation" are -- but there are also some deep cuts, and other assorted rarities. Everything here shifts focus toward Simon the singer/songwriter, seek out Rhino's 2002 set Anthology for a fuller portrait of Simon as a hit-maker; turn here if you want to get a sense of what Simon believes truly reflects her soul as an artist."

Track listing
All songs have been remastered for this collection. Credits adapted from the album's liner notes.

Disc 1

Disc 2         
      

Notes
 signifies a writer by additional lyrics

Personnel

Charts

References

External links
 Carly Simon's Official Website
 Official page at Rhino.com

Carly Simon compilation albums
2015 compilation albums
Rhino Records compilation albums
Albums produced by Paul Samwell-Smith
Albums produced by Richard Perry
Albums recorded at MSR Studios
Albums recorded at Morgan Sound Studios
Albums recorded at A&M Studios
Albums recorded at Sunset Sound Recorders
Albums recorded at Trident Studios
Albums recorded at Electric Lady Studios
Albums arranged by Paul Buckmaster